Jue Wang (born 5 March 1984, Shanghai) is a Chinese pianist.

Entirely trained in his homeland, Wang has met much success in the Spanish piano competitions, being awarded 1st prizes both in Barcelona's 51st Maria Canals and 16th Paloma O'Shea Santander International Piano Competition competitions.

References

Living people
1984 births
Chinese classical pianists
Maria Canals International Music Competition prize-winners
Prize-winners of the Paloma O'Shea International Piano Competition
Musicians from Shanghai
21st-century classical pianists